The Saraswati Vandana is a Hindu mantra. It is addressed to the goddess Saraswati, the goddess of knowledge, music, art, speech, wisdom, and learning.

Hymn 
The hymn comprises the following four verses:

References

Hindu mantras